Aquarium is the debut studio album by Danish-Norwegian band Aqua, released on 26 March 1997. Although the group had been together for three years under their original name Joyspeed, their only release under that name was a single called "Itzy Bitzy Spider". The album is best known for including the successful singles "Barbie Girl", "Doctor Jones" and "Turn Back Time", the first of those being a huge hit around the world. (The album was preceded by the two singles "Roses Are Red" and "My Oh My", with the latter re-released in 1998.)

The album's third single, "Barbie Girl", brought the group to international attention after reaching number one across Europe and in Australia and New Zealand. It would later peak at number 7 in the US. Its success helped the album reach number one in both the group's home countries, and make the top 10 in the UK and US. While not selling as highly "Barbie Girl", the album's fourth single, "Doctor Jones", was released in late 1997 and became a number one in Australia and the UK. "Turn Back Time" would later give the group their third consecutive number-one single in the UK despite reaching only number 16 in Denmark. The final single, "Good Morning Sunshine", failed to chart highly and was only released in select regions like the earlier "Lollipop (Candyman)", the group's only other song to chart in the US. The album has sold 14 million copies worldwide.

Chart performance
Aquarium debuted at number one in Denmark. As of August 2001, the album had sold 430,000 copies in Denmark. It is the third best-selling album in Denmark to date, only beaten by Danish recording artist Kim Larsen's 1983 album Midt om natten and his 1986 album Forklædt som voksen. The album debuted at number 15 on the Billboard 200 in the United States, and later peaked at number seven. It would spend a total of 50 weeks on the album sales chart, and sold 1,7 million copies in 1997. On 4 March 1999, the album was certified three times platinum by the Recording Industry Association of America (RIAA) for sales of three million units, becoming the most successful Eurodance album in the US since Ace of Base's The Sign (1993). Aquarium has been certified four times platinum by the International Federation of the Phonographic Industry (IFPI) for shipments of four million copies inside Europe.

Track listings

Personnel

Per Adebratt – producer, arrangement, mixing
Bee – backing vocals
Marian Binderup – backing vocals
Mogens Binderup – backing vocals
Vivian Cardinal – backing vocals
Douglas Carr – guitar
Delgado – producer, vocal producer, arrangement, mixing
René Dif – songwriter, lead vocals
Tommy Ekman – producer, arrangement, mixing
Björn Engelmann – mastering

Peter Hartmann – songwriter, producer, arrangement, mixing
Claus Hvass – guitar
Johnny Jam – producer, vocal producer, arrangement, mixing
Kati – backing vocals
Jan Langhoff – songwriter, producer, arrangement, mixing, guitar
Claus Norreen – songwriter, producer, arrangement, mixing, instruments
Lene Nystrøm – songwriter, lead and backing vocals
Søren Rasted – songwriter, producer, arrangement, mixing, instruments, backing vocals
Anders Øland – songwriter

Credits adapted from album liner notes.

Charts

Weekly

Year-end charts

Certifications and sales

Release history

References

1997 debut albums
Aqua (band) albums
MCA Records albums